Peter Donald Wright (January 25, 1927 – August 19, 1989), was a Canadian ice hockey player with the Edmonton Mercurys.

Career 
Wright won a gold medal at the 1950 World Ice Hockey Championships in London, England. The 1950 Edmonton Mercurys team was inducted to the Alberta Sports Hall of Fame in 2011. 

Wright later played with the Sherbrooke Saints in the QMHL, Buffalo Bisons in the AHL, as well as the Edmonton Flyers, Seattle Americans, New Westminster Royals, and Victoria Cougars in the WHL.

References

1927 births
1989 deaths
Canadian ice hockey defencemen
Ice hockey people from Alberta
People from Grande Prairie